The Renault 70 hp or Type WB was a French V-8 aero engine that first ran circa 1907. It was also  manufactured under license by Renault Limited of West Brompton, London between August 1914 and December 1918, three other companies, including Rolls-Royce, also produced the engine. A variant known as the Type WC used an external oil pump as opposed to the internal pump of the Type WB. The Renault V-8 engines were noted as inefficient but reliable, the inefficiency being mainly due to the excessively rich fuel/air mixture used to assist cooling.

Applications
Airco DH.1
Armstrong Whitworth F.K.2
Armstrong Whitworth S.S.27 airship
Blackburn Type E
Bristol B.R.7
Central Centaur IVA
Farman MF.7 Longhorn
Farman Shorthorn
Flanders F.4
HMA no.2 airship, short-lived modification
Royal Aircraft Factory B.E.2
Royal Aircraft Factory F.E.2
Royal Aircraft Factory R.E.1
White & Thompson Bognor Bloater

Preserved engines
 A partially cut open Renault 70 hp engine is preserved at the Norwegian Museum of Science and Technology (photo)

Specifications (70 hp)

See also

References

Notes

Bibliography

 Gunston, Bill. World Encyclopaedia of Aero Engines. Cambridge, England. Patrick Stephens Limited, 1989. 
 Lumsden, Alec. British Piston Engines and their Aircraft. Marlborough, Wiltshire: Airlife Publishing, 2003. .

External links

Photo "Flymotor Type 70 hk Renault" (side view), Norsk Luftfartsmuseum
Photo "Flymotor Type 70 hk Renault" (front view), Norsk Luftfartsmuseum

1910s aircraft piston engines
70